Flint the Time Detective, known in Japan as , is a Japanese anime television series directed by Hiroshi Fukutomi. It was based on a manga by Hideki Sonoda and Akira Yamauchi and was published by Bros. Comics in Japan. A second manga by Bom Bom Comics was also produced and was released as a special promo for the anime. The anime aired from 1998 to 1999 in Japan and ran for 39 episodes.

In the United States, Flint the Time Detective aired from 5 March to 5 November 2000 on the Fox Family Channel as part of the "Made in Japan Sundays" block. Reruns were also seen on Fox Kids.

The series also aired in the Philippines via GMA 7 and dubbed in Filipino language which runs from late 2000 until mid-2001.

Sanrio, the company perhaps best known for creating Hello Kitty, holds the license to Flint the Time Detective in Japan. It is the only title in the company's roster to date to be aimed at elementary school boys.

Plot
The series is centered around the adventures of Flint Hammerhead, a boy from the prehistoric era who was resurrected from his fossil prison and became a Time Detective for the Time Police, although his competency as a detective is dubious. Much like Inspector Gadget, much of the heavy thinking is done by Flint's friends Sarah and Tony Goodman who accompany him on his adventures. Flint, however, pulled his weight in battle when he would fight with the aid of his father Rocky Hammerhead whose partial resurrection left him a sentient talking rock with a face. Rocky, fashioned into a stone axe for Flint, served Flint as both sturdy weapon and adviser, the latter both in and out of battle. Flint's job as a Time Detective was to go back in time and convince Time-Shifters, cute, collectible creatures to ally with him to protect the timeline.

Usually, he fought against Petra Fina and her cronies Dino and Mite (very reminiscent of Marjo, Grocky, and Walther from Time Bokan), servants of the Dark Lord. The Dark Lord himself sought to use the Time-Shifters' powers to invade the Land of Time, the creatures' home realm from whence he had scattered them. Similar to Pokémon or Digimon, Time-Shifters originate as small, cute creatures who can "shape-shift" into much stronger forms for a time before reverting. This usually took two forms: an evil form (induced by the Petra Stamp, Uglinator's mark, or Dark Lord's magic) called a Con form and a good one brought forth by Flint and his team called a Master form.

Characters

Heroes

  / Flint Hammerhead
 
 The main protagonist of the story. Flint is a young, strong caveboy who was fossilized by Petra Fina with his father upon discovery of Getalong. He was freed by Dr. Bernard Goodman's technology and became a member of the Time Police. His weakness is when his stomach runs on empty. He was originally referred to as "Primitive Boy Genshi" in the original manga.

  / Sarah Goodman
 
 A girl from the 25th century who is Dr. Goodman's niece and Tony Goodman's twin sister who accompanies Flint on his missions.

  / Tony Goodman
 
 A boy from the 25th century who is Dr. Goodman's nephew and Sarah Goodman's twin brother who also accompanies Flint on his missions.

  / Dr. Bernard Goodman
 
 A scientist who is the uncle of Sarah and Tony Goodman. He was the one who restored Flint and Getalong. Bernard has a crush on Jillian Gray and he is responsible in sending a time shifter to aid Flint. In the manga, he smokes. In the anime, he only smokes during his teenage years.

  / Rocky Hammerhead
 
 Flint's caveman father who was fossilized alongside his son. When his son was de-fossilized, Rocky ended up as a flat stone rectangle. Dr. Goodman made him into a high-tech stone axe for Flint to use as a weapon. In this form, Rocky has a beam that can fossilize and de-fossilize anything except those with evil minds and can grow for his Hammerhead Rock attack.

  / Pterry
 
 A small robotic Pteranodon that accompanies Flint on his missions. He is responsible for his Memory Beam Erase Mode which erases the events of anyone who meets Flint and his friends. In the original Japanese version, Pterry is a female.

  / Jillian Gray
 
 Exclusive to the anime, Jillian Gray is the chief of the Time Police. She sends Flint on his missions in time to retrieve the Time Shifters. Dr. Bernard Goodman has a crush on her and tries to get her to love him which doesn't work. In the manga, her position is filled by an old man.

  / Merlock Holmes
 
 A member of the Time Police who is descended from vampires and has a crush on Sarah. He is accompanied on his missions by Bindi. His English name is an obvious play on Sherlock Holmes. As he is descended from Vampires, he has above human strength and a high vitality, plus can put someone in a trance. He can also transform due to his Vampire heritage (called "Koumori-Kyoichiro" (蝙蝠京一郎, "Bat-Kyoichiro") in the Japanese dub). Unlike the rest of the cast, he first appears in vol. 2 of the Bros. Comics. In the Bom Bom manga, he is reluctant to become friends with Flint and his friends due to his heritage.

  / Old Timer
 
 A Father Time-esque man who handles the Land of Time and watches Flint's adventure while riding a floating pig. Using a cut-out of an old man, he would inform Jillian Gray about a Time Shifter sighting.

  
 He is a Bom Bom Comics exclusive character and part of the Time Police. He was the one in this version of the manga to discover Bubblegum. He also tells Flint and his friends about Merlock.

Villains

 
 
 Petra Fina's boss and one of the main antagonists of the series who resides in the Land of Dread. He is a blue-haired, white-skinned man who wears a mask that made him powerful, faster, and enabled him to pull off magical abilities. The Dark Lord was placed in charge of keeping the souls within the Land of Dread trapped. Eventually, the Dark Lord resented this task as he led a lonely life due to the fact that everything in the Underworld was frozen over. Due to the effects of the Land of Dread, he never grew old and remained a young man. He was the one responsible for scattering the Time Shifters across time following his attack on the Land of Time. He also turned four flowers into his Great Four. In the end, the Dark Lord's true form was revealed after Flint's attack was enough to knock off his mask. After the clock in the Land of Time was restarted, the Dark Lord returned to the Land of Dread.

 , also known as Time Pilfer Lady or  / Petra Fina Dagmar / Ms. Iknow
 
 One of the main antagonists of the series. Petra Fina is an enemy of the Time Police wanted for stealing and messing up time and space. Originally a nice girl who grew up in a rich family, she was getting sick with how her mother wanted to control everything in her life. She eventually ran off from home and started a life of crime. Petra Fina allied herself with the Dark Lord out of having a "school-girl" infatuation with him. Though she eventually realized too late she was a pawn. Petra Fina and her henchmen travel through time in the Catamaran, a cat-shaped ship that can transform into a giant humanoid cat robot. When not on missions given to her, she takes the form of Ms. Iknow, a strict teacher of Flint, Sarah, and Tony's class. By the finale, she had a temporary truce with the heroes that only lasted until the Dark Lord was defeated. After that, Flint and the other heroes pursue Petra Fina through the timeline.

 
 
 An experimental eel who was freed from the lab he was in and made humanoid by Petra Fina. Dino serves as one of her lackies. When not on missions, he takes the form of a teacher named Mr. Dino.

 
 
 An experimental frog who was freed from the lab he was in and made humanoid by Petra Fina. Mite serves as one of her lackies. When not on missions, he takes the form of Principal Mite.

Great Four
The Great Four are Dark Lord's own Time-Shifters, created from flowers. Just like the regular Time Shifters, all four can transform, in the Japanese dub this form is called "Super" despite being a form of bad transformation, whereas the English dub changes it to "kon" to match the other Shifters bad transformations. In the finale, the four decided to revert to their original selves on their own.

 
 
 An Oriental-themed warrior who fights with a staff. He fought Flint on different occasions. Super Ninja default form is of a pin that Dark Lord sent to Petra Fina. He was eventually withdrawn by his master following his defeat in his fight with Mosbee-Master, Coconaut-Master, and Dipper-Master. Super Ninja is patterned after the Nio. In the original Japanese version, he ends his sentences with "-Nyo". Super Ninja is also noted for his habit of talking in first person, when the normal way of addressing oneself in Japanese is in 3rd person. The English dub makes a mistake with his naming and he ends up being the only member to retain the use of "Super" in their transformations name. Additionally, he is also only called ever called "Super Ninja", even though just "Ninja" should be the default name. He also talks in first person in the Japanese dub, rather than in third person, when referring to himself; this is atypical of a Japanese speaker.

 
 
 A skull-type imp (with a chalk-white body, dark blue horns, red eyes and yellow fangs and nails) who first appeared in the form of Petra Fina's Petra-Stamp, which enabled her to turn any Time Shifter into her slave. His presence was soon revealed when he was awakened to replace Super Ninja and take over Petra Fina's group. He can head-butt Time Shifters for Petra Fina to control and can possess people (he once possessed Merlock which turned him into a monstrous version of himself).  resembles a larger version of himself and can shoot beams in the ground which summons skeletons that obey his every command. In the original Japanese version, he ends his sentences with "-dasu".

 
 
 A bird-like creature capable of teleportation, the only female among the Great Four. In the English dub, Nascal was changed to male. Flint had to fight her in order to get into Dark Lord's castle. Nascal-Con resembles a three-headed humanoid condor monster. In the original Japanese version, she ends her sentences with "-ka-ka-ka".

 
 
 A mushroom-type creature who uses video game-based attacks to prevent Flint, Dino, and Mite from reaching Petra Fina. In battle, he attacks with mushrooms where one of them had mushrooms that became evil versions of Flint's friends like a Bunny Sarah, a winged Tony, Rocky Hammerhead's Petra-Stamped form, and Merlock Holmes' monster form. Ominito-Con resembles an upside-down mushroom. In the original Japanese version, he ends his sentences with "-Gera".

Time Shifters
 are creatures that help the Old Timer to run the Land of Time until the Dark Lord came and scattered most of them across time and space. Most of the Time Shifters' Master forms have a humanoid appearance (notable exceptions are Lynx and Unita), whereas their Con forms have a demonic appearance.

 
 
 An egg-shaped penguin-type Time Shifter who has a love beam that makes people "get along". Found in the Stone Age where she first met Flint Hammerhead. Getalong is the only one that has neither Con nor Master forms shown within the anime. Though she did try to transform in one episode. At the end of the series, she was the only Shifter to stay with Flint and the others instead of going back to the Land of Time. She was first introduced in vol. 2 of the original Bros. Comics manga as "Zabieha"(ザビエハ) and quickly became a favorite of Flint and his friends afterwards. In this manga, Zabieha was transformed into an evil version of herself.

 
 
 A Dogū-type Time Shifter who can make people dance.  looks like a ceramic vase-like creature that can eat earthenware, can pull off the Petra-Stomp attack, and shoot them from his mouth. As , he looks more humanoid with big arms and chest and he can perform the Power Whirl attack. Found in 2nd century AD Japan during the reign of Queen Himiko.

 
 
 A winged snake-type Time Shifter who can turn anything to gold.  is a dragon-like creature protruding from a jewelry box that fires beams.  is a humanoid version of herself with a feathered headdress, and that can fire gold-colored blinding beams. Found in Latin America in the 16th century when the Conquistadors invaded and where Petra Fina got to her first enough to get the Conquistadors on their side. The only character who introduced in this time is Lucas who is the son of one of the Conquistadors.

 
 
 A shy fox-like Time Shifter (holding a Fatsia fan) that can enter any story books.  takes the form of a pink ball of fur with a fox-like oni mask, had five tails that it stood on and can use them to fire spikes.  is a yamabushi-themed humanoid fox whose main attack involves throwing exploding necklaces. She was found in Edo-era Japan in 794 AD with Murasaki Shikibu.

 
 
 An elephant head-type Time Shifter that can freeze anything (whatever form he was in).  is a real woolly mammoth with an up-side down head and has a club attached to his trunk which fires a Petra-Freeze attack.  is a humanoid mammoth, still with an upside-down head, who can freeze anything from his ears. Mosbee is also the brother of Dipper. He was found in 1812 Russia when Napoleon Bonaparte invaded the country.

 
 
 Coconaut was first introduced in vol.2 of the original manga and appeared in all versions of the series thereafter. A Time-Shifter whose only method of communicating is via telling people if something is right or wrong. He can sense the weather patterns.  which takes the form of an egg-shaped yellow fish with a skull face who can call upon a deadly storm and shoot water from its mouth.  looks more "advanced" with a fish-like water gun for a left arm to perform the Tidal Wave attack. Found by Christopher Columbus in 1492 AD, somewhere in the Atlantic Ocean.

 
 
 A Time Shifter that can shoot bubbles.  is a hermit crab who can trap people inside his shell and fires a machine-gun like attack.  is a humanoid robot with machine guns for both arms which he uses to shoot stinging bubbles. Found in Edo-era Japan in 1582 with Nobunaga Oda.

 
 
 A Sphinx-type Time Shifter who's good at riddles. The snake head on Lynx's crown can also talk.  looks similar to a sarcophagus that can split in half.  is depicted as a wemic with an Egyptian crown that was only shown as an image in Dr. Goodman's computer. He was found in Ancient Egypt in 323 BC where Petra Fina captured him first and used his power to turn her into a queen.

 
 
 A bird-like Time Shifter that can bring drawings to life.  is a vulture-like creature that has a long, sharp drill-like beak that can Petra-Drill into almost anything.  is a slender, colorful humanoid bird that can really fly and has super-strength. Found by a young Auguste Rodin.

 
 
 A baseball-themed Time Shifter who looks like a catcher's mitt. He can turn anything into a baseball and can hit fast balls at his opponents, no matter what his form was.  looks like a four-armed umpire with a left arm for a head and neck who can throw baseballs at very fast speeds.  resembles a baseball player who is equipped with a bat that can hit flaming home runs. Found by a young Babe Ruth in his hometown of Baltimore in the year 1906 and helped him out in his baseball training.

 
 
 An Ammonite-like Time Shifter that give or take life force. She became Merlock's partner. Bindi has feelings for him, which often take the form of being jealous when he seems to be paying more attention to someone or something else besides her. While she seems self-obsessed, it really comes from a deep-hidden fear of being alone.  is a hermit crab-like monster that can drain the life force of her enemies and use this advantage to become stronger as well as having an ability to bring things to life like terracotta soldiers at the time when she was captured by Petra Fina.  is an angel-like fairy. Found in Transylvania by Vlad III Dracula. At the end of the series, Bindi chooses to remain Merlock's partner instead of returning to the Land of Time. In the Japanese dub, she refers to herself in first person as "Am-Chan", a play on the English word "am".

 
 
 A Santa Claus-themed Time Shifter who can turn anything into a toy.  took on a form of a centauroid reindeer with a skull-like head where it can summon large war-like toys like possessed carousel horses and runaway Ferris wheels.  is a "super-powered" version of himself who is only shown on Dr. Goodman's computer. Found in 1651 in Paris, France during the Christmas season.

 
 Blademan 
 Thud 
 Arrowman 
 Snapper 
 A group of playing card-themed Time Shifters made up of Blademan the Swordsman (spade, red), Thud the All-Powerful (clover, green), Arrowman the Archer (diamond, blue), and Snapper the Camera Whiz (heart, pink). They are modeled on The Three Musketeers and J.A.K.Q. Dengekitai. The four can merge while transforming into their powered forms.  is a centipede monster that looks similar to a jester-like Grim Reaper with the four faces on its different segments. Though this form is vulnerable to being separated by being attacked in its different segments.  on the other hand is a knight equipped with a sword and shield. Found in 2000 during Dr. Goodman's teenage time in Tokyo.

 
 
 Plumella was originally introduced in vol.1 of the Bros. comics manga, but her appearance was changed in later versions. She is a squirrel-like Time Shifter that can trap anyone in their self-portraits.  has large hands for ears where she cannot only use the Petra-Bash, but she can also trap her opponents in paint goo. She was found in the time of Leonardo da Vinci (just before he begins painting the Mona Lisa) and was captured by Petra Fina first in order to paint a portrait of her.

 
 
 A propeller monoplane/bird-like Time Shifter that can put wings on anyone.  is a vulture-like flying fortress that attacks with flying propellers and darts. As , he becomes similar to a jet aircraft flying at great speeds and can be ridden by anyone. He was found in the care of the young Wright Brothers.

 
 A Moai-type Time Shifter who is the biggest of the Time Shifters.  is a giant, floating Moai statue with hands which shoot magma and can even cause volcanic eruptions. As Petra Fina could not get the Petra-Stamp on Moah to assume this form, she had Dino and Mite fire the Petra-Stamp Missile from the Catamaran to do the job.  is a giant humanoid rock warrior who can summon the giant stone "Moai" by jumping on the ground to prevent a tidal wave using a seawall of Moai statues. He was found in the Pacific on what is now Easter Island.

 
 
 An Elekiter-type Time Shifter with power over electricity.  can attack with electric shocks.  is bigger than his normal self (save for the addition of two arms and two legs like a real human) which looks like and is modeled on giant robots like Voltes V and Daimos. He was found in Edo-era Japan with Hiraga Gennai.

 
 A Time Shifter that can make anyone strong by simply touching them. He looks similar to a dumbbell in his normal form.  is black and spiky and can attack people (especially Flint) with heavy, metallic balls and tie people up with ropes. The gladiator-like  has enormous strength. He was found in Ancient Greece in the year 4 BC with a runner named Damon.

 
 
 A telepathic Time Shifter that looks like a winged unicorn. As Old Timer's aid, he travels through time and space without any mechanical assistance. He was found in the Grand Canyon in an unknown period.

 
 
 A turtle-like Time Shifter that can trap anyone in his shell.  can shoot crystal spikes from his shell and can turn into a large rolling ball of crystal spikes. Raldo can also transform into  who resembles a humanoid turtle knight who can freeze any enemy with his Raldo-Freeze. He was found in the time of Petra Fina's childhood and was her best friend.

 
 
 A Time Shifter that has power over plants.  is a rose-themed dragon with dragon-like heads for hands who can breathe fire and her head is hard like diamonds as seen when she was unfazed by Rocky's attacks. She also can turn into  which looks like a pink humanoid flower and attacks with pollen. Found in the time of young King Arthur. In the Japanese version, Leafy was a female. In the English dub, Leafy is a male.

 
 
 A Time Shifter that collects weapons (especially the naginata and the backsword) and is an expert samurai. As the metallic, multi-armed , he can shoot spikes from his body and relies too much on weapons which is one of his weaknesses. He resembles a modern version of samurai in his  form as seen in his unused artwork. He helped Saito Musashibo Benkei.

 
 A tapir-type Time Shifter that helps people sleep.  uses an ability that can confuse his opponents enough to causes Flint and Talen-Master to fight each other. His Monk-Con form is dark and has a bell for a snout. His  form is more humanoid and wears a cape as seen in his unused artwork. He was found by the famous author Hans Christian Andersen who used Nightcap to sleep and his characters in his dreams helped Flint and Talen-Master to break free from Nightcap-Con's spell.

 
 
 A Time Shifter who resembles an eighth note symbol with a mouth of a bugle that can recognize beautiful music and can use it to overpower any person's emotions.  is a frog-like creature equipped with a pipe organ, using ultrasonic attacks.  looks similar to a conductor that can wrap his enemies in sheet music. Found in the time of Wolfgang Amadeus Mozart and a young Ludwig van Beethoven.

 
 
 A Time Shifter that looks like a walking purse. He can hypnotize people using the persuasion of wealth and can make real money by eating takoyaki.  is a Dimetrodon/purse monster which is bigger and has spikes all over his body where it can shoot gold bullions as an attack. His  form looks like a sultan covered in gold as seen in his unused artwork. Found in Edo-era Japan with Kinokuniya Bunzaemon.

 
 A caterpillar-type Time Shifter that can turn anyone into an insect by looking at them through his magnifying glass.  is a moth/mantis-like creature that attacks with sickle-like arms and a morphing ray that it shoots from its mouth. His  form resembles an insectoid as seen in his unused artwork. Found in the period of a young Jean Henri Fabre.

 
 
 An elephant-type Time Shifter and brother of Mosbee. He can locate water. As , he can shoot fire from his trunk. As , he shoots fire from his hands. Both of Dipper's evolved forms bear some resemblance to his brother's. Found by Marco Polo.

 
 
 A Chinese dragon-like Time Shifter who's an expert of mystic martial arts whom can discharge shockwaves from his fists. Knuckle also makes for a great kenpo master where he and anyone he trains can perform a powerful remote punch attacks. One of the most powerful Time Shifters even when he becomes , where he resembles a blue red-eyed Chinese dragon and has the strength enough to defeat Musey-Master. His  form is a Chinese dragonoid with four arms and a nunchaku as seen in his unused artwork. Found in Hong Kong in 1972 by a man named Lee. Knuckle could be a reference to the film Enter the Dragon, while his owner could be a reference to actor Bruce Lee.

 
 
 A Time Shifter that looks like a pumpkin-headed ghost. He can scare people by spitting out luminous spooks.  is a gigantic pumpkin with ivy branches for arms and legs and attacks with throwing axes. His  form dresses like a witch, has bat wings, and holds a staff with blue fire on top that gives it the appearance of a broom as seen in unused artwork. Found in the time of Thomas Edison.

 
 A fox-like Time Shifter who can make shadow clones of anyone. When he is under Petra's control,  has a black face and blazing fire on its head, and attacks with shurikens and creates evil shadow doubles. His  form looks like his Shadow-Con form, but with a kinder face and more robotic look as seen in unused artwork. Found by a cowardly Miyamoto Musashi.

 
 
 A star-type Time Shifter who has the power of encouragement. Orbit is the only missing Time Shifter not to be found in any time period as Flint, Dino, and Mite came across her while on a mission to rescue Petra Fina from Dark Lord.  has a tank-like bottom with cannons that can break through walls.  is a humanoid version of herself that controls light.

 
 A wolf-type Time Shifter who only appears in the Bom Bom comics promo manga. He can walk on air and is fond of Getalong. Wolfen also wears a collar around his neck which the Old Timer can contact him through. Wolfen-Con is a demon wolf that shoots a tornado blast from his mouth. Wolfen-Master is a werewolf swordsman who is swift and fast where he can also use his sword like a boomerang.

 
 A crocodile-like Time Shfiter that appeared in the original Bros. Comics in vol.1. He is able to eat anything and was the very first Time Shifter introduced in the series. Haniwani is often depicted as chewing on things, even clothes and people.

 
 A Time Shifter who first appeared in the original manga in vol.1. Hanasaka has the appearance of a dead tree stump. His powers are identical to Leafy's.

 
 A Time Shifter who first appeared in the original manga in vol.2. His appearance is of a giant stone imp-like creature carrying a large tray on his head.

 
 Appeared in the Sanrio Puroland "Dream Time Machine" (夢のタイムマシン) cinema as an exclusive special only to the theme park.

Episodes

English adaptation
Saban Entertainment licensed & did the English adaptation for Flint, which is very different from the original Japanese version.

All the original Japanese music score is replaced with a new American-made soundtrack; all the sound effects are changed as well. The series was Americanized, with characters names and some places being altered, Flint explains in episode 6 that they come from the USA instead of Japan.  Many characters, such as Pterry, changed genders. Parts of each episode were cut and some filler scenes were added.  Art edits were only minor, with Dr. Bernard Goodman's lab receiving one of the few noticeable changes.

Manga

Bros. Comics
The original manga was released over the course of 3 volumes. It features many prototype ideas and concepts that never featured in the anime.

Bom Bom comics
A 6 chapter manga was produced as a promotion for the anime. It features a slightly different approach to the storyline.

Chapter 1: Old Timer is attacked by Petra under the command of the Dark Lord.  She is attacked by Wolfen who has transformed into his master form. As he attacks, Petra stamps him which cancels out his master form and transforms him into his kon form. Later due to Flint's interference, Wolfen-kon attacks Flint. Petra is beaten by Flint and in turn fossilizes him, his father and Getalong. Petra drops the fossil-gun in the process.
Chapter 2: In the fall out of the attack, Bubblegun appears. Flint rescues him after defeating his kon form.
Chapter 3: This chapter features Flint rescuing Jitterbug.
Chapter 4: Talen is the focus as Petra begins to rewrite the stories of Hans Christian Andersen.
Chapter 5: Time Detective Merlock encounters Coconuat who lands on a ship. When Flint appears, Merlock rejects any attempts that Flint makes to befriend him due to the way Vampires are prosecuted by humans, making Flint feel bad for Merlock. Petra stamps Coconuat who transforms into Coconuat form. During the attack by Coconuat-kon, Merlock is knocked out. The chapter ends with Coconuat being defeated and Merlock taking note of his new friends. 
Chapter 6: Batterball is the focus of the chapter. The chapter ends with the final pages taking about the upcoming anime. The characters are shown holding scripts.

Openings and Endings

Openings

Endings
  (1-14)
  (15-26)
  (27-38)
  (39)

Cast

Japanese cast
 Yukiji as Genshi-kun
 Nana Mizuki as Sora Yamato
 Chiaki Morita as Tokio Yamato
 Chinami Nishimura as Puu-chan
 Katsumi Suzuki as Time-G
 Kappei Yamaguchi as Kyoichiro Narugami
 Yumi Touma as T.P. Lady/Hitomi Aino
 Toshiyuki Morikawa as Masked Man/Dark Lord
 Wataru Takagi as Nioja
 Sachiko Sugawara as Nascal
 Mitsuo Iwata as Gera
 Takuma Suzuki as Desudasu

English cast
 R. Martin Klein - Flint Hammerhead
 Bob Papenbrook - Rocky Hammerhead, Blademan of The Cardians
 Greg Berg - Pterry, Arrowman of the Cardians
 Steve Blum - Change, Hans Christian Andersen (ep. 27)
 Richard Cansino - Bernard Goodman, Thud of the Cardians, Raldo
 Tifanie Christun - Sarah Goodman, Plumella
 Brian Donovan - Tony Goodman, Monk
 Mari Devon - Jillian Gray
 Doug Erholtz - Merlock Holmes, Bubblegum, Lucas (ep. 3), Auguste Rodin (ep. 9)
 Melissa Fahn - Bindi
 Tom Fahn - Leafy, Hiraga Gennai (ep. 20), Super Ninja
 Anna Garduno - Wing
 Barbara Goodson - Petra Fina Dagmar/Ms. Iknow
 Lex Lang - Dino/Mr. Dino
 David Lodge - Mite/Principal Mite
 Wendee Lee - Dipper, Orbit, Nashimi (ep. 2)
 Dave Mallow - Coconaut
 Mona Marshall - Getalong, Snapper of The Cardians
 Joe Ochman - Nascal, Uglinator
 Derek Stephen Prince - Batterball, Elekin, Young Orville Wright (ep. 17), Jean Henri Fabre (ep. 30)
 Philece Sampler - Jitterbug, Queen Himiko (ep. 2)
 Joshua Seth - Unita (Basic Form)
 Brianne Siddall - Mosbee, Doron
 Michael Sorich - Lynx, Ominito, Young Babe Ruth (ep. 11)
 Melodee Spevack - Eldora, Artie
 Kim Strauss - The Old Timer, Elfin
 Laura Summer - Talen, Young Petra Fina (ep. 24)
 Kirk Thornton - Knuckle
 Tom Wyner - Dark Lord

Additional voices
 Michael Lindsay - Young Wilbur Right (ep. 17), Thomas Edison (ep. 34)
 Peggy O'Neal - 
 Colleen O'Shaughnessey - Murasaki Shikibu (ep. 4)
 Michael Reisz - Bruce Lee (ep. 33)
 Dave Wittenberg - Young King Arthur (ep. 25), Marco Polo (ep. 31)

Crew

English Crew
 Richard Epcar - Voice Director
 Mary Elizabeth McGlynn - Voice Director
 Michael Sorich - Voice Director

References

External links
 
  - Enoki Films USA

1998 anime television series debuts
Anime with original screenplays
Japanese children's animated adventure television series
Adventure anime and manga
BBC children's television shows
Children's manga
Group TAC
Kodansha manga
Sanrio characters
Sanrio
Shōnen manga
Television series by Saban Entertainment
Japanese time travel television series
TV Tokyo original programming